

Reinhold Eckardt (26 March 1918 – 30 July 1942) was a night fighter pilot in the Luftwaffe of Nazi Germany during World War II. He was a recipient of the Knight's Cross of the Iron Cross during World War II.  Eckardt died on 30 July 1942 after his parachute caught the end of his plane after he bailed out. During his career he was credited with 22 aerial victories, 3 during the day and 19 at night.

Awards

 Knight's Cross of the Iron Cross on 30 August 1941 as Oberleutnant and Adjutant of the II./Nachtjagdgeschwader 1
 German Cross in Gold on 21 August 1942 as Oberleutnant in the 7./Nachtjagdgeschwader 3

References

Citations

Bibliography

 
 
 

1918 births
1942 deaths
People from Bamberg
Luftwaffe pilots
German World War II flying aces
Recipients of the Gold German Cross
Recipients of the Knight's Cross of the Iron Cross
Luftwaffe personnel killed in World War II
People from the Kingdom of Bavaria
Burials at Lommel German war cemetery
Military personnel from Bavaria
Aviators killed by being shot down